Jonathan Edwards is the first album by the singer-songwriter Jonathan Edwards. The album received some mainstream attention thanks to the catchy political-pop single, "Sunshine". Several FM stations also played the drug-related song "Shanty".

Track listing

Charts

Personnel 
Jonathan Edwards – vocal, guitar, harp, bass guitar

Additional musicians
Richard Adelman – drums
Bill Keith – banjo
Jef Labes – keyboard
Eric Lilljequist – guitar
Stuart Schulman – bass guitar, violin

Technical personnel
Peter Casperson – production
Michael Leary – engineering
Nancy Lopes – photography
Jimm Roberts – album design
Bob Runstein – engineer

References 

1971 debut albums
Atco Records albums
Capricorn Records albums
Jonathan Edwards (musician) albums